Septoria hydrangeae is a fungal plant pathogen infecting hydrangeas.

References

External links 
 Index Fungorum
 USDA ARS Fungal Database

Fungal plant pathogens and diseases
Ornamental plant pathogens and diseases
hydrangeae